SCH-48461 is a cholesterol absorption inhibitor.

During the early phases of an NPC1L1 inhibitor discovery program at Schering-Plough, conformationally restricted analogs based on the 2-azetidinone backbone were targeted by Burnett and co-workers. Early in the biological evaluation, it became apparent that even though the in vitro ACAT inhibitory activity of these analogs was modest (e.g., IC50 values of 2–50 mM), they exhibited significant activity in a cholesterol-fed hamster model (CFH). The discovery of the prototypical 2-azetidinone CAI, SCH-48461 (ACAT IC50 ~26 mM, ED50 of CE reduction in hamsters ~2.2 mpk) and the details of the first-generation SAR have been described in detail.

References

Hypolipidemic agents
Lactams
Phenol ethers